James Barbour (born April 25, 1966) is an American singer and theatre actor who played the title role in the Broadway production of The Phantom of the Opera from February 2015 until December 2017. Among his other credits are the Beast in Beauty and the Beast and Sydney Carton in A Tale of Two Cities, for which he was nominated for a Drama Desk Award.

In 2008, Barbour pleaded guilty to two counts of endangering the welfare of a child, and he admitted to engaging in sexual activities with a 15-year-old on more than one occasion.

Early life and education 
Barbour was born April 25, 1966, in Cherry Hill, New Jersey. He graduated from Hofstra University, where he majored in English and Theatre with a minor in Philosophy and Physics.

Career 
Barbour made his Broadway debut in 1993, in the production of Cyrano: The Musical. He also played Billy Bigelow in Carousel in 1994 and the Beast in Beauty and the Beast in 1998. He was nominated for a Drama League Award in the Outstanding Actor In A Musical category for his role as Edward Rochester in Jane Eyre. He played Leon Czolgosz in Assassins. He also appeared in the Broadway production of Urinetown, and in the national tours of The Secret Garden and Camelot. He also co-founded Laughing Dog Entertainment with the theatre director Steve Binder.

In late 2007, he performed the role of Sydney Carton in a pre-Broadway musical adaptation of Charles Dickens' A Tale of Two Cities at the Asolo Repertory Theatre in Sarasota, Florida. In 2008, Barbour reprised his role in the Broadway production of A Tale of Two Cities, which closed after 60 performances. In the New York Times, critic Ben Brantley wrote that he disliked both the production and Barbour's performance in it. Barbour was nominated for the Drama League, Drama Desk, and Outer Critics Circle Awards in the Best Actor in a Musical category for his role in A Tale of Two Cities.

In 2011, it was announced that he would play the supporting role of Jack Favel in the Broadway musical adaptation of Rebecca. The production was plagued with legal and financial problems, and the production has been indefinitely postponed after multiple delays. Barbour then played the title role in the Broadway production of The Phantom of the Opera for nearly three years, from February 2015 until December 2017.

He launched a holiday concert series at New York's Sardi's Restaurant in 2008. Each performance featured a guest performer, including Brandi Burkhardt, Natalie Toro, Deborah Gibson, Marla Schaffel, Marc Kudisch, and Kevin Earley. He repeated the holidays concerts in 2009 in both New York and Los Angeles. In 2010, he expanded these concerts to six cities. He followed this with a second Sardi's concert series, "Love Songs", featuring numerous Broadway classics. The annual holiday concert series has since moved to Birdland, a Manhattan jazz club.

In March 2017, Barbour's likeness was immortalized in a caricature portrait on the wall at Sardi's. The same year, he finished writing The Ghosts of the Majestic, a solo show about John Raitt, Robert Goulet, and Ezio Pinza, three notable actors that performed at the Majestic Theatre.

Personal life 
Barbour is married to fellow performer Dana Stackpole, with whom he has two daughters.

He has been an Artist Committee Board member of The Actors Fund of America for since 2000 during which time he has performed many charitable fundraisers in support of the Fund and Broadway Cares/ Equity Fights AIDS. In 2014, he gave a fundraising performance for Scientology. He has given benefit concerts for his alma mater, Hofstra University.

Arrest 
In April 2006, Barbour was arrested and charged with five counts of sexual abuse and sodomy, after a woman accused him of committing statutory rape against her in 2001, when she was 15 years old. In December 2006 he was indicted by a grand jury in New York for said crime. 

In January 2008, Barbour pleaded guilty to two misdemeanor counts of endangering the welfare of a minor in exchange for a lesser sentence in jail and three years' probation. Also, in accordance with his plea bargain, Barbour made a public allocution to these misdemeanors. He served his sentence at Rikers Island, which lasted for 36 days beginning on February 29, 2008.

Broadway appearances 
Cyrano: The Musical (1993)
Carousel (1994)
Beauty and the Beast (1998–1999)
Jane Eyre (2000)
Urinetown (2001)
Assassins (2004)
A Tale of Two Cities (2008)
The Phantom of the Opera (2015)

Filmography 
Beauty and the Beast: A Concert on Ice (1996) (TV)
The Real Adventures of Jonny Quest (1996) (TV)
Cyrano: The Musical (1997) (TV)
Just Shoot Me! (1997) (TV)
Houdini (1998)
Sex and the City (1999) (TV)
Twinkle Toes (1999)
The District (2000) (TV)
That's Life (2001) (TV)
Eight Crazy Nights (2002)
Ed (2003) (TV)
Alchemy (2005)

Discography 
Bring Me Giants (2010)
 A Gift of Christmas (2009)
A Tale of Two Cities, The Musical: International Studio Cast Recording (2008)
 Broadway in Concert (with Hershey Felder) (2007)
Dracula: The Musical Concept Recording
Jane Eyre – Original Cast Recording
Assassins – Broadway Cast Recording
Love Songs
The Gift

Awards 

2001 Drama League Award – Edward Rochester, Jane Eyre ~ The Musical (WIN)
2006/7 LA Weekly Garland Award – Back From Broadway (WIN)
2007 Sarasota Magazine Award for Best Actor in a Musical – Sydney Carton, A Tale of Two Cities (WIN – Tie)
2008-2009 BroadwayWorld Fan Choice Award for Best Actor in a Musical – Sydney Carton, A Tale of Two Cities (Finalist /Runner-Up )
2009 Outer Critics Circle Award for Best Actor in a Musical – Sydney Carton, A Tale of Two Cities (Nomination)
2009 Drama Desk Award for Best Actor in a Musical – Sydney Carton, A Tale of Two Cities (Nomination)

References

External links 

 
 
 
 

1966 births
20th-century American male actors
20th-century American male singers
20th-century American singers
21st-century American male actors
21st-century American male singers
21st-century American singers
Living people
American Scientologists
American male film actors
American male musical theatre actors
American male television actors
Hofstra University alumni
People from Cherry Hill, New Jersey
Male actors from New Jersey
Singers from New Jersey